= Star FK Radium =

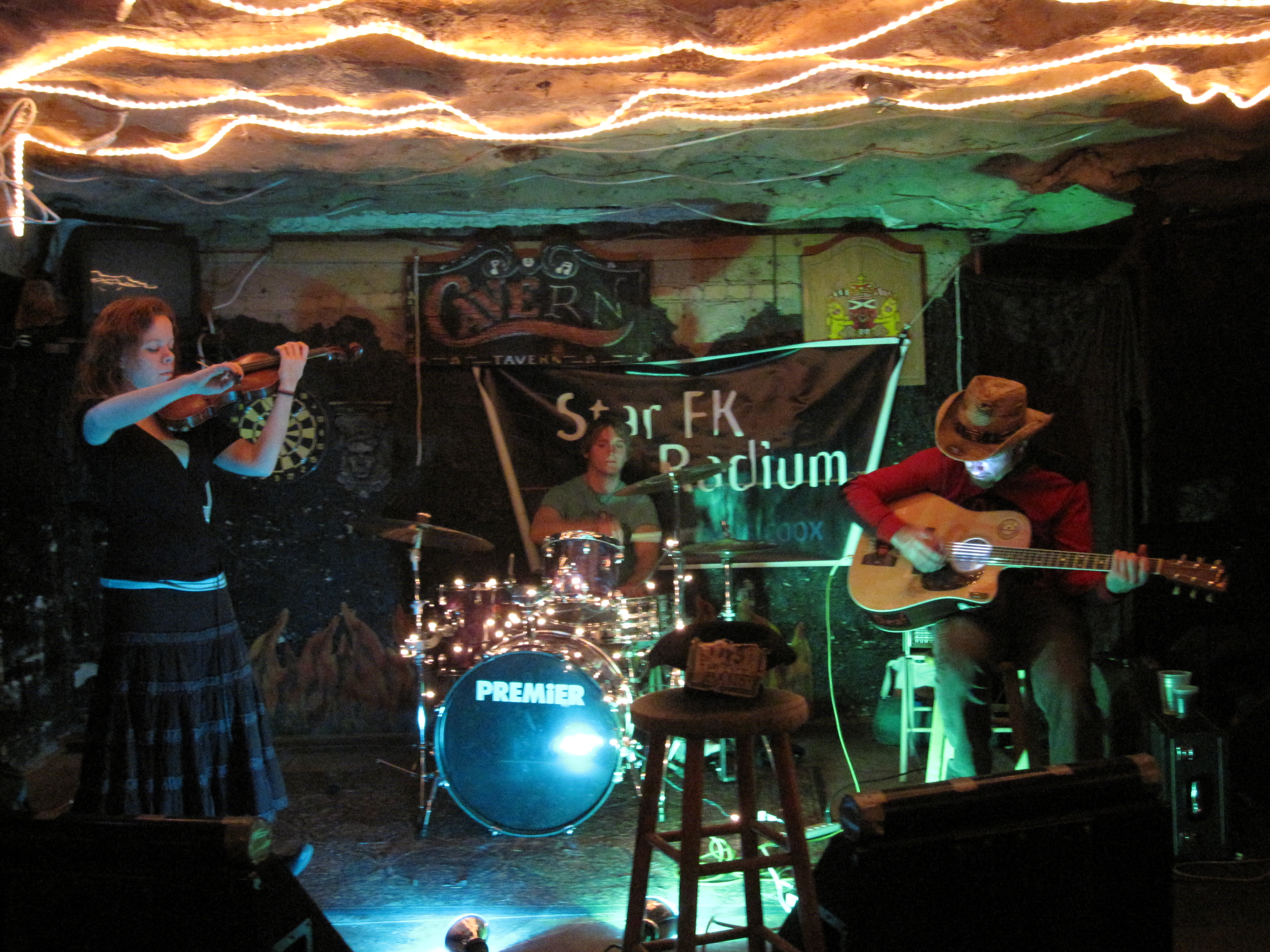
- Star FK Radium

Background information
- Origin: Washington, DC US
- Genres: Chamber rock, post rock
- Website: www.starfkradium.com

Star FK Radium is an American instrumental rock trio formed in June 2008. The band, which consists of Bill Martien (guitar), Alissa Taylor (violin) and Matt Clarke (drums), plays a form of chamber rock and post rock which it calls "musicbox". The trio is currently reported to be working on its second full length release.

== Discography ==
- Blue Siberia (Independent release, 2010)
- Solitude Rotation (Independent release, 2012)
